In Mesopotamian religion, Tiamat (  or) is a primordial goddess of the sea, mating with Abzû, the god of the groundwater, to produce younger gods. She is the symbol of the chaos of primordial creation. She is referred to as a woman and described as "the glistening one". It is suggested that there are two parts to the Tiamat mythos. In the first, she is a creator goddess, through a sacred marriage between different waters, peacefully creating the cosmos through successive generations. In the second Chaoskampf Tiamat is considered the monstrous embodiment of primordial chaos.  Some sources identify her with images of a sea serpent or dragon.

In the Enûma Elish, the Babylonian epic of creation, Tiamat bears the first generation of deities; her husband, Apsu, correctly assuming that they are planning to kill him and usurp his throne, later makes war upon them and is killed. Enraged, she also wars upon her husband's murderers, bringing forth multitudes of monsters as offspring. She is then slain by Enki's son, the storm-god Marduk, but not before she had brought forth the monsters of the Mesopotamian pantheon, including the first dragons, whose bodies she filled with "poison instead of blood". Marduk then integrates elements of her body into the heavens and the earth.

Etymology
Thorkild Jacobsen and Walter Burkert both argue for a connection with the Akkadian word for sea, tâmtu(), following an early form, ti'amtum. Burkert continues by making a linguistic connection to Tethys. It is thought that the proper name ti'amat, which is the vocative or construct form, was dropped in secondary translations of the original texts because some Akkadian copyists of Enûma Elish substituted the ordinary word tāmtu ("sea") for Tiamat, the two names having become essentially the same due to association. Tiamat also has been claimed to be cognate with Northwest Semitic tehom (תְּהוֹם) ("the deeps, abyss"), in the Book of Genesis 1:2.

The Babylonian epic Enuma Elish is named for its incipit: "When above" the heavens did not yet exist nor the earth below, Apsu the subterranean ocean was there, "the first, the begetter", and Tiamat, the overground sea, "she who bore them all"; they were "mixing their waters".  It is thought that female deities are older than male ones in Mesopotamia and Tiamat may have begun as part of the cult of Nammu, a female principle of a watery creative force, with equally strong connections to the underworld, which predates the appearance of Ea-Enki.

Harriet Crawford finds this "mixing of the waters" to be a natural feature of the middle Persian Gulf, where fresh waters from the Arabian aquifer mix and mingle with the salt waters of the sea. This characteristic is especially true of the region of Bahrain, whose name in Arabic means "two seas", and which is thought to be the site of Dilmun, the original site of the Sumerian creation beliefs. The difference in density of salt and fresh water drives a perceptible separation.

Appearance
In the Enûma Elish her physical description includes a tail, a thigh, "lower parts" (which shake together), a belly, an udder, ribs, a neck, a head, a skull, eyes, nostrils, a mouth, and lips. She has insides (possibly "entrails"), a heart, arteries, and blood.

Tiamat is usually described as a sea serpent or dragon, although Assyriologist Alexander Heidel disagreed with this identification and argued that "dragon form can not be imputed to Tiamat with certainty". Other scholars have disregarded Heidel's argument: Joseph Fontenrose in particular found it "not convincing" and concluded that "there is reason to believe that Tiamat was sometimes, not necessarily always, conceived as a dragoness". The Enûma Elish states that Tiamat gave birth to dragons, serpents, scorpion men, merfolk and other monsters, but does not identify her form.

Mythology
Abzu (or Apsû) fathered upon Tiamat the elder deities Lahmu and Lahamu (masc. the "hairy"), a title given to the gatekeepers at Enki's Abzu/E'engurra-temple in Eridu. Lahmu and Lahamu, in turn, were the parents of the 'ends' of the heavens (Anshar, from an-šar = heaven-totality/end) and the earth (Kishar); Anshar and Kishar were considered to meet at the horizon, becoming, thereby, the parents of Anu (Heaven) and Ki (Earth).

Tiamat was the "shining" personification of the sea who roared and smote in the chaos of original creation. She and Apsu filled the cosmic abyss with the primeval waters. She is "Ummu-Hubur who formed all things".

In the myth recorded on cuneiform tablets, the deity Enki (later Ea) believed correctly that Apsu was planning to murder the younger deities, upset with the noisy tumult they created, and so captured him and held him prisoner beneath his temple, the E-Abzu ("temple of Abzu"). This angered Kingu, their son, who reported the event to Tiamat, whereupon she fashioned eleven monsters to battle the deities in order to avenge Apsu's death. These were her own offspring: Bašmu (“Venomous Snake”), Ušumgallu (“Great Dragon”), Mušmaḫḫū (“Exalted Serpent”), Mušḫuššu (“Furious Snake”), Laḫmu (the “Hairy One”), Ugallu (the “Big Weather-Beast”), Uridimmu (“Mad Lion”), Girtablullû (“Scorpion-Man"), Umū dabrūtu (“Violent Storms"), Kulullû (“Fish-Man") and Kusarikku (“Bull-Man”).

Tiamat possessed the Tablet of Destinies and in the primordial battle she gave them to Kingu, the deity she had chosen as her lover and the leader of her host, and who was also one of her children. The terrified deities were rescued by Anu, who secured their promise to revere him as "king of the gods". He fought Tiamat with the arrows of the winds, a net, a club, and an invincible spear. Anu was later replaced by Enlil and, in the late version that has survived after the First Dynasty of Babylon, by Marduk, the son of Ea.

And the lord stood upon Tiamat's hinder parts,
And with his merciless club he smashed her skull.
He cut through the channels of her blood,
And he made the North wind bear it away into secret places.

Slicing Tiamat in half, he made from her ribs the vault of heaven and earth. Her weeping eyes became the sources of the Tigris and the Euphrates, her tail became the Milky Way. With the approval of the elder deities, he took from Kingu the Tablet of Destinies, installing himself as the head of the Babylonian pantheon. Kingu was captured and later was slain: his red blood mixed with the red clay of the Earth would make the body of humankind, created to act as the servant of the younger Igigi deities.

The principal theme of the epic is the rightful elevation of Marduk to command over all the deities. "It has long been realized that the Marduk epic, for all its local coloring and probable elaboration by the Babylonian theologians, reflects in substance older Sumerian material," American Assyriologist E. A. Speiser remarked in 1942 adding "The exact Sumerian prototype, however, has not turned up so far." This surmise that the Babylonian version of the story is based upon a modified version of an older epic, in which Enlil, not Marduk, was the god who slew Tiamat, is more recently dismissed as "distinctly improbable".

Interpretations
The Tiamat myth is one of the earliest recorded versions of the Chaoskampf, the battle between a culture hero and a chthonic or aquatic monster, serpent or dragon. Chaoskampf motifs in other mythologies linked directly or indirectly to the Tiamat myth include
the Hittite Illuyanka myth, and in Greek tradition Apollo's killing of the Python as a necessary action to take over the Delphic Oracle.

In the second "Chaoskampf Tiamat is considered the monstrous embodiment of primordial chaos.

Robert Graves considered Tiamat's death by Marduk as evidence for his hypothesis of an ancient shift in power from a matriarchal society to a patriarchy. The theory suggests Tiamat and other ancient monster figures were depictions of former supreme deities of peaceful, woman-centered religions that turned into monsters when violent. Their defeat at the hands of a male hero corresponded to the overthrow of these matristic religions and societies by male-dominated ones. This theory is rejected by academic authors such as Lotte Motz, Cynthia Eller and others.

In popular culture

The depiction of Tiamat as a multi-headed dragon was popularized in the 1970s as a fixture of the Dungeons & Dragons roleplaying game inspired by earlier sources associating Tiamat with later mythological characters such as Lotan (Leviathan).

The five headed draconic goddess in the Dungeons & Dragons game is named Tiamat, and stars as one of the primary antagonists in the Dungeons & Dragons TV series.
Tiamat appears as a six-headed dragon in the first Final Fantasy as a member of the Four Fiends.
In Bruce Coville's Jeremy Thatcher, Dragon Hatcher (from the Magic Shop series), a boy is given a dragon egg from Elias's magic shop and names the dragon Tiamat, with whom he develops a mental connection.
 The mobile game Fate/Grand Order depicts Tiamat as a powerful goddess and an Evil of Humanity. She firstly appears as a woman with gigantic horns, then as a massive humanoid with demonic horns and a tail, and finally as a draconic being of similar size. The anime Fate/Grand Order - Absolute Demonic Front: Babylonia shows her in the same manner as the game.
 In Japanese anime, manga and light novels series Shakugan no Shana Tiamat is a female Crimson Lord from a parallel universe called Crimson Realm (紅世, Guze), bound by contract to one of the characters.
 In music, Tiamat is a Swedish Gothic metal band that formed in Stockholm in 1987.
 The Swedish black metal band Dissection constantly reference Tiamat in their 2006 album Reinkaos
 In the 2010 video game Darksiders, one of the Chosen that must be slain by Horseman War is Tiamat, the gigantic queen of vampire bats.
 The eighth book of The Expanse series by James S. A. Corey is titled Tiamat's Wrath, and was published in 2019.
 Tiamat, in the image of a giant mermaid, appears as a boss in the platform video game Spelunky 2.
 Tiamat is the final boss in the 2013 action role-playing game Young Justice: Legacy. 
 Tiamat is one of the playable gods in the MOBA SMITE, the first Babylonian god released in 2021.
 Tiamat is the inspiration for Tiamut, a Celestial in the Marvel Universe.
 In Stargate SG-1, Tiamat was a Goa'uld System Lord in the First Goa'uld Dynasty that predates the time of the series. In the season five episode "The Tomb" and season six episode "Full Circle" an artifact known as the Eye of Tiamat serves as a plot device.
 Tiamat appears as one of the oldest and most powerful of the water-elemental Marid in The Daevabad Trilogy by S. A. Chakraborty.

See also
Sea of Suf - a primordial sea in the World of Darkness in Mandaean cosmology

Notes

References

External links

Enuma Elish
Enuma Elish, the Babylonian creation story

 
Chaos (cosmogony)
Chaos gods
Creator deities
Creator goddesses
Dragons
Characters in the Enūma Eliš
Mesopotamian goddesses
Sea and river goddesses
Killed deities
Sea serpents